John Alexander Jaramillo Gómez (born 11 June 1980) is a Colombian football midfielder. He currently plays for Fortaleza.

References

1980 births
Living people
Colombian footballers
Colombia under-20 international footballers
Footballers from Medellín
Categoría Primera A players
Independiente Medellín footballers
Deportivo Pasto footballers
Atlético Huila footballers
Atlético Junior footballers
Atlético Bucaramanga footballers
Fortaleza C.E.I.F. footballers
Association football midfielders